Ruth Kahn may refer to:
 Ruth Ward Kahn, Jewish American lecturer and writer
 Ruth Brown Kahn, American civic leader in Dallas, Texas